Argyrolobium is a genus of flowering plants in the family Fabaceae. It belongs to the subfamily Faboideae. Members of this genus are found in Africa and south Asia.

Species
Argyrolobium comprises the following sections and species:

Section Amplexicaule
 Argyrolobium amplexicaule (E. Mey.) Dummer
 Argyrolobium crinitum Walp.

Section Lunare

 Argyrolobium lunare (L.) Druce
 subsp. lunare 
 subsp. sericeum 

 Argyrolobium splendens Walp.

Section Transvaalense
 Argyrolobium baptisioides Walp.

 Argyrolobium frutescens Burtt Davy

 Argyrolobium longifolium (Meissner) Walp.
 Argyrolobium megarrhizum Bolus
 Argyrolobium muddii Dummer

 Argyrolobium speciosum Eckl. & Zeyh.
 subsp. speciosum 
 subsp. macrophyllum 

 Argyrolobium transvaalense Schinz
 Argyrolobium wilmsii Harms

Section Polyphyllum
 Argyrolobium crassifolium Eckl. & Zeyh.

 Argyrolobium incanum Eckl. & Zeyh.

 Argyrolobium parviflorum T.J.Edwards
 Argyrolobium polyphyllum Eckl. & Zeyh.

 Argyrolobium tenue (E.Mey.) Walp. (tentatively placed here)
 Argyrolobium trifoliatum (Thunb.) Druce

Section Argyrolobium

 Argyrolobium adscendens Walp.

 Argyrolobium aciculare Dummer

 Argyrolobium angustissimum (E. Mey.) T.J. Edwards
 Argyrolobium argenteum (N.J. Jacq.) Eckl. & Zeyh.
 Argyrolobium barbatum Walp.

 Argyrolobium campicola Harms
 Argyrolobium candicans Eckl. & Zeyh.
 Argyrolobium collinum Eckl. & Zeyh.

 Argyrolobium filiforme Eckl. & Zeyh.

 Argyrolobium harmsianum Harms
 Argyrolobium harveyanum Oliv.

 Argyrolobium humile E. Phillips

 Argyrolobium lotoides Trautv.

 Argyrolobium marginatum Bolus
 Argyrolobium molle Eckl. & Zeyh.

 Argyrolobium pachyphyllum Schltr.

 Argyrolobium pauciflorum Eckl. & Zeyh.
 subsp. pauciflorum Eckl. & Zeyh.
 subsp. semiglabrum Harv.
 Argyrolobium petiolare Walp.

 Argyrolobium pseudotuberosum T.J.Edwards
 Argyrolobium pumilum Eckl. & Zeyh.

 Argyrolobium rarum Dummer

 Argyrolobium rotundifolium T.J.Edwards
 Argyrolobium rupestre (E. Mey.) Walp.
 subsp. aberdaricum (Harms) Polhill
 subsp. remotum (A. Rich.) Polhill
 subsp. rupestre (E. Mey.) Walp.

 Argyrolobium sericosemium Harms

 Argyrolobium stipulaceum Eckl. & Zeyh.

 Argyrolobium tomentosum (Andrews) Druce
 Argyrolobium tuberosum Eckl. & Zeyh.

 Argyrolobium velutinum Eckl. & Zeyh.

Middle-Eastern and Asian Species
The following species are found in the Middle East and in south Asia. They have not been assigned to a section.

 Argyrolobium aegacanthoides (Vved.) Moteetee

 Argyrolobium arabicum (Decne.) Jaub. & Spach
 Argyrolobium barikotense Rech.f.
 Argyrolobium biebersteinii P.W. Ball

 Argyrolobium confertum Polhill
 Argyrolobium crotalarioides Jaub. & Spach

 Argyrolobium flaccidum (Royle) Jaub. & Spach

 Argyrolobium pulvinatum Rech. f.
 Argyrolobium roseum (Cambess.) Jaub. & Spach
 var. album (U.C.Bhattach.) L.B.Chaudhary
 var. elongatum (Ali) L.B.Chaudhary
 var. ornithopodioides (Jaub. & Spach) Moteetee
 var. roseum (Cambess.) Jaub. & Spach
 var. subuniflorum Boiss.
 Argyrolobium stenophyllum Boiss.

Tropical African Species
The following species are found in tropical Africa. They have not been assigned to a section.

 Argyrolobium aequinoctiale Baker

 Argyrolobium eylesii Baker f.
 Argyrolobium fischeri Taub.
 Argyrolobium friesianum Harms

 Argyrolobium macrophyllum Harms

 Argyrolobium ramosissimum Baker

 Argyrolobium schimperianum A. Rich.
 Argyrolobium stolzii Harms
 Argyrolobium vaginiferum Harms

Unassigned
The following species have not been assigned to a section.

 Argyrolobium bodkinii Dummer

 Argyrolobium catati (Drake) M. Peltier

 Argyrolobium itremoense Du Puy & Labat

 Argyrolobium microphyllum Ball

 Argyrolobium pedunculare Benth.

 Argyrolobium saharae Pomel
 Argyrolobium terme Walp.
 Argyrolobium thomii Harv.

 Argyrolobium zanonii (Turra) P.W. Ball

Species names with uncertain taxonomic status
The status of the following species is unresolved:

 Argyrolobium adscendens (E. Mey.) Walp. ex Harms
 Argyrolobium armindae Marrero Rodr.
 Argyrolobium dasycarpum Hochst. ex Baker
 Argyrolobium dimidiatum Schinz
 Argyrolobium fallax Ball
 Argyrolobium filicaule Hochst. ex Engl.
 Argyrolobium fulvicaule Hochst. ex Engl.
 Argyrolobium krebsianum C.Presl
 Argyrolobium monticola Baker f.
 Argyrolobium mucilagineum Blatt.
 Argyrolobium purpurascens Blatt.
 Argyrolobium remotum Hochst. ex A.Rich.
 Argyrolobium robustum T.J.Edwards
 Argyrolobium sessilifolium Janka
 Argyrolobium strigosum Blatt.

Phylogeny
The following relationships have been suggested for the South African species of the genus Argyrolobium:

References

Genisteae
Fabaceae genera